The Mississippi Student Religious Liberties Act of 2013 is a 2013 act which protects the views of students in any educational institution from being reprimanded for their religious views. Under the bill, a school may not discipline a student for expressing anti-LGBT views either verbally or through written assignments.

Legislative history
On February 7, 2013, Mississippi Senate passed, with 50 ayes, 1 nay, and 1 vacancy, Senate Bill 2633. March 6, 2013, the Mississippi House of Representatives passed, with a 109 ayes, 6 nays, and 6 absent or not voting, 1 present, and 2 vacancies, SB 2633. On March 14, 2013, Governor Phil Bryant signed the bill and it went into effect on July 1, 2013.

See also
LGBT rights in Mississippi

References

2013 in LGBT history
Discrimination against LGBT people in the United States
LGBT in Mississippi
Politics of Mississippi
Mississippi law